Train is a 2008 slasher film directed and written by Gideon Raff and starring Thora Birch and Gideon Emery.

Plot
In Eastern Europe, a group of US college athletes unknowingly board a train that will become one deadly ride. The students are participating in a wrestling championship; they include Todd (Derek Magyer) and his girlfriend Alex (Thora Birch), Sheldon (Kavan Reece), Claire (Gloria Votsis), and young assistant coach Willy (Gideon Emery). After a hard match, they sneak away from their hotel to an underground club. However, the next morning, they return too late for their train to Odessa.

Coach Harris (Todd Jensen) has stayed behind to wait for them. At the station, a woman named Dr. Velislava (Koina Ruseva) approaches and explains that train tickets are normally purchased after one has boarded. The coach and team members join her in boarding the train. Two workers from the train take their passports, and later burn them.

In the dinner car, the coach is joined by the doctor, who flirts with him. They go to his room to have sex, but she injects him with a tranquilizer. In the following scene, the coach is seen in a torture chamber, screaming as he is stitched in the abdomen. Meanwhile, the 4 students and the assistant coach drink and play a game truth or dare.  Todd gets dared to run down to the end of the train and back in his underwear. He reaches the end of the train and is found by one of the workers who charges at him and captures him. Todd is strung up, has his ribcage broken open, spine severed and eyes removed.  Dr. Velislava is then seen fetching a mother who has a son with what appears to be severe glaucoma in his left eye.

The next morning, upon finding Todd still missing, the remaining students and assistant coach Willy start looking for the missing members of their group.  While searching, Sheldon is attacked by the two demented workers, who drag him to the torture car.  Dr. Veliskava opens the window to the torture car and allows a middle-aged man to view Sheldon's genitalia, upon his approval, Sheldon's genitalia are cut off without any anesthesia which causes him to blackout.  In the next scene he is shown passed out as he is being stitched back up. Claire reaches the end cart and finds the burnt remains of the passports.  She is caught looking for more information and is hooked by the mouth and dragged to the chamber. Willy and Alex find the torture chamber where Todd is vivisected and Sheldon is alive in a cage. They free him and when they see Todd is still breathing, Sheldon kills him out of mercy. Just then, the torturer arrives dragging in Claire. Willy and Alex escape, chased by the torturer, but Sheldon and Claire are left behind. Alex and Willy are caught by the doctor; they realize all the other passengers are transplant patients, and tourists are being harvested for organs.

Back in the torture car, Claire is still alive despite having a huge iron hook driven through her jaw. She, Alex, and Willy watch in horror as Sheldon is vivisected and his heart pulled out. While the captors go to another car to perform the transplant, Alex manages to escape and hide in a sleeper compartment. The next morning, at a military checkpoint, the conductor drags Claire off the train to give to the platoon as a bribe. The passengers (including Alex) watch the platoon take Claire (who, to judge by her screams, is being sexually assaulted) as the train pulls away.

That night the train reaches what appears to be a huge medieval hospital. Alex, disguised, sneaks off into the building, and soon finds Willy, horribly injured but still alive, chained to a bed. They escape into the woods. In the morning, Alex leaves Willy behind briefly, but then from a distance she sees him brutally murdered by the torturers from the hospital.

Now determined, she returns to the train, still parked near the hospital and about to pull away to its next destination. Alex kills each of her torturers, douses the train with gasoline and sets it ablaze, and decouples the last car, which slows to a stop. As she stops to look over the bridge, she's attacked by one of the surviving torturers. After a struggle, she manages to subdue him. When he wakes up, he finds himself strapped to the train tracks. Moments later, a train runs over him. Alex escapes down the tracks, and in the last scene, we see her some time later, about to enter a wrestling match with grim confidence.

Cast

Production
The film was shot on location in Bulgaria and was originally set to be a remake of the 1980 horror film Terror Train, which starred Jamie Lee Curtis. However, it later evolved into an original project, sharing only the setting of a train.

Release
In the United States it was released first with its NC-17 cut (the highest age classification in the USA) in October at the Screamfest Festival according to the website Bloody Disgusting.  It was acquired by Lionsgate to trim the movie to an R rating (second highest age classification) for its commercial distribution.

References

External links

2008 films
2008 horror films
Rail transport films
Mass murder in fiction
Films about organ trafficking
American slasher films
Films set in Europe
Films shot in Bulgaria
Films directed by Gideon Raff
Films scored by Michael Wandmacher
2000s English-language films
Films produced by Boaz Davidson
2000s American films